The original San Diego Gulls team was founded in 1966 as part of the Western Hockey League. The Gulls played at the San Diego Sports Arena.

Willie O'Ree, the first black athlete to play in the NHL, was an All-Star for the Gulls. His jersey is retired. The Gulls were coached by Max McNab for six seasons from 1966 to 1972, and by Jack Evans for two seasons from 1972 to 1974. The Gulls ceased operations in 1974, when the World Hockey Association's Jersey Knights relocated to San Diego, becoming the San Diego Mariners.

Season-by-season results
Source: Legend: Pct=Winning percentage

See also
 San Diego Gulls (1990–95)

References

External links
 WHL San Diego Gulls Historical Site

Ice hockey teams in San Diego
Philadelphia Flyers minor league affiliates
Western Hockey League (1952–1974) teams
1966 establishments in California
1974 disestablishments in California
Ice hockey clubs established in 1966
Ice hockey clubs disestablished in 1974
Boston Bruins minor league affiliates